John Graham "Red" Kerr (July 17, 1932 – February 26, 2009) was an American basketball player, coach, and color commentator. He played in the NBA from 1954 to 1966, mainly as a member of the Syracuse Nationals. He later held several coaching and administrative positions before embarking on a thirty-three-year career as a television color commentator for the Chicago Bulls.

Playing career

High school
Although Johnny Kerr's first passion was soccer, an eight-inch growth spurt during his senior year at Tilden Technical High School, and some friendly persuasion from basketball Head Coach Bill Postl and school principal Robert Lakemacher, Kerr turned his attention to basketball. The 6' 9" center soon led his school's basketball team to the 1950 Chicago Public League Championship. Kerr graduated mid-year from Tilden (January 1950) and was all set to attend Bradley in the fall, however, after a visit from Illini freshman Irv Bemoras, touting the benefits of playing for Harry Combes and the Fighting Illini, Kerr made a visit to Champaign and quickly changed his mind.

College
After committing to Illinois in the fall of 1950, Kerr played on the freshman team for the 1950–51 season. As he played on the freshman team, the 1950-51 Fighting Illini varsity team would not only win the Big Ten Championship, they would also play in the NCAA tournament, placing third. Unfortunately for Kerr, the following season would see the two leading scorers, team MVP and captain Don Sunderlage (471 points) and Ted Beach (295 points), graduate.

Even with the loss of 766 points, the Illini picked up where they had left off making Kerr's sophomore season a huge success. He was named the starting center for the 1951-52 Fighting Illini and would lead the team to a Big Ten Conference Championship with a 12-2 conference record and a 22–4 record overall and advanced to the NCAA tournament. Illinois would defeat Dayton and Duquesne to earn a berth in the Final Four (only sixteen teams played in the tournament back then), but would lose to St. Johns, 61–59. They would defeat Santa Clara in the third place game. This was Illinois’ third Big Ten Championship and 20-game winning team within a four-year span and completed the season with a final AP ranking of No. 2 in the nation. Kerr would score a team-high 357 points in 26 games for an average of 13.7 points per game.

Kerr joined three other starters from the previous season on the 1952-53 Illini team, however, the team would not enjoy the same amount of success. The team would lose four conference games during the Big Ten season and finish at 18-4 overall with a conference record of 14–4, which would give them a second-place finish to National Champion Indiana. Kerr, on the other hand, would find his successes to be just as fruitful as the previous campaign. Kerr would score a team-high 386 points in 22 games for an average of 17.5 points per game while the team would finish the season with a final AP ranking of No. 11 in the nation.

Kerr's senior season was personally the best of his three varsity seasons, however, the team would be the least successful during the same time frame.
The 1953-54 Illini would finish third in the Big Ten with a 10–4 record and an overall record of 17-5 and they would also finish the season with a final AP ranking of No. 19 in the nation.  As for Kerr, for the third year in a row, he would lead the team in scoring by shattering Illinois’ single-season scoring record by tallying 556 points in just 22 games for a 25.3 points per game average. Over his three varsity seasons, Kerr scored 1,299 points giving him an overall average of 18.6 points per game. He was elected to the University of Illinois' "All-Century Team" in 2004.

Professional basketball
In 1954, the Syracuse Nationals selected Johnny Kerr with the sixth overall pick of the NBA draft. During his first season (1954–55), Kerr averaged 10.5 points and 6.6 rebounds and helped the Nationals capture their first NBA Championship. He became a three-time All-Star (1956, 1959, 1963) with the Nationals, despite playing in the shadow of future Hall-of–Famer Dolph Schayes.

In 1963, the Nationals relocated to Philadelphia and became known as the 76ers. Two years later, Kerr was traded to the Baltimore Bullets for Wali Jones. After averaging 11.0 points and 8.3 rebounds for the Bullets during the 1965–66 season, Kerr was selected by the Chicago Bulls in the 1966 NBA Expansion Draft. However, Kerr voluntarily retired so that he could become the coach of his hometown's new basketball team. He ended his career on November 4, 1965, with a 108–107 loss to New York, with respectable totals of 12,480 points and 10,092 rebounds, along with the NBA record for most consecutive games played (844) until 1983 when he was surpassed by Randy Smith.

Coaching career
Kerr is credited with  bringing Jerry Sloan to the Chicago Bulls. The team went 33–48 in 1966–1967 and became the first expansion team to make the playoffs in its inaugural season. For this accomplishment, Kerr was awarded the NBA Coach of the Year Award. He is also the only coach to receive this award after his team finished with a losing record. The Bulls went 29-53 the following season, rallying from a 1–15 start to earn another playoff berth. However, feuds with team owner Dick Klein forced Kerr to leave the Bulls during the summer of 1968 and sign with the Phoenix Suns, another expansion team in need of its first coach. Unfortunately, the Suns finished with a 16–66 record in 1968–69, and after starting the 1969–70 season with a 15–23 record, Kerr was forced to resign.

Broadcasting career
Despite resigning as coach, Kerr stayed with the Suns franchise for the remainder of the 1969–70 season, working as a broadcaster with Hot Rod Hundley. He spent the next two seasons as a business manager with the ABA's Virginia Squires, then returned to the Chicago Bulls to work in their front office. In 1975, the Bulls' play-by-play announcer, Jim Durham, suggested that Kerr provide commentary during games, and Kerr remained as a color commentator until the end of the 2007–08 season.

As a broadcaster, Kerr oversaw the Bulls' six championships in the 1990s and Michael Jordan's entire career with the team. He was known for making the call on "The Shot", Jordan's series-winning basket in Game 5 of the first round of the 1989 Eastern Conference Playoffs. Over the years, Kerr and Jordan developed a pre-game ritual in which Jordan would head to the broadcasting area and playfully clap talcum powder in front of Kerr. Jordan later said, "I don't know how it started. I think he had a nice suit on and I wanted to mess him up a little."

Kerr made occasional appearances as a halftime commentator during the first half of the 2008–09 season, but struggles with prostate cancer gradually limited his involvement. The Bulls honored Kerr for his years of service at a February 10, 2009 halftime ceremony, where the team unveiled a sculpture of Kerr that would stand in the United Center. At the ceremony, Kerr also received the Naismith Memorial Basketball Hall of Fame's John W. Bunn Lifetime Achievement Award, presented by Jerry Colangelo. February 10, 2009, was declared Johnny Red Kerr Appreciation Day in the city of Chicago by Mayor Richard M. Daley.

Death
Kerr died of prostate cancer on February 26, 2009, only hours after the death of fellow Bulls legend Norm Van Lier.

Honors
 1952 – 2nd Team All-Big Ten
 1952 – NCAA Final Four All-Tournament Team
 1952 – Honorable Mention All-American
 1953 – 2nd Team All-Big Ten
 1953 – Honorable Mention All-American
 1953 – 1st Team All-Big Ten
 1954 – 2nd Team All-American
 1954 – Team Most Valuable Player 
 1954 – Big Ten Player of the Year
 1954 – Earned the Chicago Tribune''s Silver Basketball award
 1967 – Earned NBA Coach of the Year Award
 1973 – Inducted into the Illinois Basketball Coaches Association's Hall of Fame as a player.
 2004 – Elected to the "Illini Men's Basketball All-Century Team".
 2007 – Named one of the 100 Legends of the IHSA Boys Basketball Tournament.
 2008 – Honored as one of the 33 honored jerseys which hang in the State Farm Center to show regard for being the most decorated basketball players in the University of Illinois' history.
 2018 – Inducted into the Illinois Athletics Hall of Fame

Career statistics

College

NBA

Regular season

Playoffs

All-Star Games

Head coaching record

|-
| style="text-align:left;"|Chicago
| style="text-align:left;"|
|81||33||48||.407|| style="text-align:center;"|4th in Western Conference||3||0||3||.000
| style="text-align:center;"|NBA Coach of the Year
|-
| style="text-align:left;"|Chicago
| style="text-align:left;"|
|82||29||53|||| style="text-align:center;"|4th in Western Conference||5||1||4||.200
| style="text-align:center;"|Resigns from Bulls
|-
| style="text-align:left;"|Phoenix
| style="text-align:left;"|
|82||16||66||.195|| style="text-align:center;"|7th in Western Conference||-||-||-||-
| style="text-align:center;"|Suns inaugural season
|-
| style="text-align:left;"|Phoenix
| style="text-align:left;"|
|38||15||23|||| style="text-align:center;"|4th in Western Conference||-||-||-||-
| style="text-align:center;"|Fired after 38 games
|- class="sortbottom"
| style="text-align:left;"|Total
| ||283||93||190|||||| 8||1||7||.125||

See also
 List of National Basketball Association career rebounding leaders

References

External links
 BasketballReference.com: Red Kerr (as player)
 BasketballReference.com: Red Kerr (as coach)

1932 births
2009 deaths
All-American college men's basketball players
American men's basketball coaches
American men's basketball players
Baltimore Bullets (1963–1973) players
Basketball coaches from Illinois
Basketball players from Chicago
Deaths from cancer in Illinois
Centers (basketball)
Chicago Bulls announcers
Chicago Bulls expansion draft picks
Chicago Bulls head coaches
Deaths from prostate cancer
Illinois Fighting Illini men's basketball players
National Basketball Association All-Stars
Philadelphia 76ers players
Phoenix Suns head coaches
Power forwards (basketball)
Syracuse Nationals draft picks
Syracuse Nationals players
Virginia Squires executives